Raymond Barna Lukács (born 30 May 1988) is a Romanian professional footballer who plays as a forward for Békéscsaba Előre.

Career
In his career, Lukács also played for teams such as: Bihor Oradea, Astra Ploiești, Salgótarján, Kisvárda or Kazincbarcika, among others.

Personal life
His brother, Zsombor Lukács is also a footballer.

References

External links
 
 
 

Sportspeople from Oradea
Romanian sportspeople of Hungarian descent
1988 births
Living people
Romanian footballers
Association football forwards
Liga I players
FC Astra Giurgiu players
Liga II players
Liga III players
FC Bihor Oradea players
CS Luceafărul Oradea players
Nemzeti Bajnokság I players
Nemzeti Bajnokság II players
Mezőkövesdi SE footballers
Kazincbarcikai SC footballers
Salgótarjáni BTC footballers
Kisvárda FC players
Békéscsaba 1912 Előre footballers
Romanian expatriate footballers
Expatriate footballers in Hungary
Romanian expatriate sportspeople in Hungary